Lucas Atkinson (born July 6, 1981) is an American politician. He is a member of the South Carolina House of Representatives from the 113th District, serving since 2016. He is a member of the Democratic party.

Background
Atkinson attended Clemson University and graduated in 2004. He works as a consultant.

Electoral history

2016
After incumbent representative J. Wayne George decided to not seek re-election, Atkinson became a candidate for his seat in District 57. In the Democratic primary, he ran against two candidates, Lee Walter Jenkins Jr. and Ryan M. Waller. Atkinson won with 58.16% of the vote. In the general election, he defeated Republican Ethan Brown to win by 7,981 votes.

2018
Atkinson was unopposed in the Democratic primary and general election.

2020
In the Democratic primary held in June, Atkinson defeated Miko Pickett with 60.6% of the vote. He ran unopposed in the general election to win a third term.

Committee assignments
Agriculture, Natural Resources & Environmental Affairs
Rules Committee

Election history

References

Living people
1981 births
Democratic Party members of the South Carolina House of Representatives
21st-century American politicians